Patricia Maureen Liston (born February 20, 1992) is an American professional basketball player. Born in Chicago, Illinois, she is a graduate of Fenwick High School in Oak Park, Illinois. She was drafted in 2014 by the Minnesota Lynx of the WNBA.

USA Basketball
Liston was selected to be a member of the team representing the US at the 2013 World University Games held in Kazan, Russia. The team, coached by Sherri Coale, won the opening four games easily, scoring in triple digits in each game, and winning by 30 or more points in each case. After winning the quarterfinal game against Sweden, they faced Australia in the semifinal. The USA team opened up as much as a 17 point in the fourth quarter of the game but the Australian team fought back and took a one-point lead in the final minute. Crystal Bradford scored a basket with 134 seconds left ant he game to secure a 79–78 victory. The gold medal opponent was Russia, but the USA team never trailed, and won 90–71 to win the gold medal and the World University games Championship. Liston averaged 8.2 points, hitting 64% of her field goal attempts.

Duke  statistics

Source

WNBA
Liston made her WNBA debut on May 16, 2014. Liston was waived by the Lynx in April 2016.

WNBA career statistics

Regular season

|-
| align="left" | 2014
| align="left" | Minnesota
| 25 || 0 || 7.2 || .400 || .467 || .667 || 1.1 || 0.3 || 0.0 || 0.1 || 0.1 || 2.2
|-
|style="text-align:left;background:#afe6ba;"|  2015†
| align="left" | Minnesota
| 31 || 2 || 12.0 || .420 || .429 || 1.000 || 1.0 || 0.7 || 0.3 || 0.0 || 0.3 || 3.4
|-
| align="left" | Career
| align="left" | 2 years, 1 team
| 56 || 2 || 9.9 || .413 || .441 || .875 || 1.1 || 0.6 || 0.2 || 0.1 || 0.2 || 2.8

Playoffs

|-
| align="left" | 2014
| align="left" | Minnesota
| 2 || 0 || 1.0 || .000 || 000 || 000 || 0.0 || 0.0 || 0.0 || 0.0 || 0.0 || 0.0
|-
|style="text-align:left;background:#afe6ba;"|  2015†
| align="left" | Minnesota
| 3 || 0 || 0.7 || .000 || .000 || .333 || 0.0 || 0.0 || 0.0 || 0.0 || 0.0 || 0.3
|-
| align="left" | Career
| align="left" | 2 years, 1 team
| 5 || 0 || 0.8 || .000 || .000 || .333 || 0.0 || 0.0 || 0.0 || 0.0 || 0.0 || 0.2

References

External links
WNBA Rookie Profile
Duke Blue Devils bio

1992 births
Living people
All-American college women's basketball players
American expatriate basketball people in South Korea
American women's basketball players
Basketball players from Chicago
Duke Blue Devils women's basketball players
Guards (basketball)
Minnesota Lynx draft picks
Minnesota Lynx players
Parade High School All-Americans (girls' basketball)
Universiade gold medalists for the United States
Universiade medalists in basketball
Medalists at the 2013 Summer Universiade